Kim Jong-hwan (Hangul: 김종환; born February 1, 1966) is a South Korean singer, referred to as the "Emperor of the Adult Ballad," for his popularity among middle-aged fans. He debuted in 1985 with the album, I Have No Place to Rest, and is known for pop ballads including, "Reason for Existence," and "One Hundred Year Promise."

Discography

Studio albums

Awards

References 

Living people
1966 births
South Korean male singers
Grand Prize Golden Disc Award recipients